A grievance is a wrong or hardship suffered, real or supposed, which forms legitimate grounds of complaint. In the past, the word meant the infliction or cause of hardship.

See also
 Complaint system

References
 

Judicial remedies
Lawsuits
Civil rights and liberties